Surha, locally called Surha Taal (in =lake) is a natural lake located in Ballia District of Uttar Pradesh in India. It is an oval shaped lake  which has an area of 34.32 km2. and is located about 17 km. north from the Ballia city along the river Ganges.

Geography
Geographically Surha is located in Middle Ganga Plains along the margins of Ganges. It owes its origin to the meandering of Ganges and now a narrow outlet of about 23 km named Kathar Nala connects it with the river and is the main outflow channel.
The area of the lake is subject to seasonal variation and the lake expands to its maximum during monsoon rains in the month of August–September every year. The lake discharges its waters into Ganga river through Kathar Nala. Some times the flow of kathar Nala gets reversed during the high floods in Ganges and Sarayu rivers.
Surha Tal has been historically famous for the variety of migratory and native birds. It was declared a Bird Sanctuary in 1991.

Traditionally the ecosystem of Surha Tal has been well adopted to cultivation of Rice and fishing but the basic problem of the area is overpopulation which exerts tremendous pressure on the catchment of the lake as well as lake itself. Some exotic species have also been reported to encroach the small lakes in the basin.
Studies have shown stable characteristics of water quality.

Possibility of Impact Crater

Believe that pond name "surha-taal" [ surha = big mouth, taal= pond] in ballia district, of uttar Pradesh india , is a crater. since it is 8 km x6km across, deep, round shape. impact may be at an angle thats why 50% is a perfect circle. No one knows how this pond was made, people say its natural. however most of that area/region of this part of india is very flat. Such a big deep lake suddenly not possible naturally.

Economics
Surha Tal has been important fishing area and livelihood of many fishermen around the lake solely depends on the lake.

The most important role of the Surha Tal however is the storage of water and recharge of local water table around the year, therefore facilitating the cultivation of Rice all around the year, which is generally not possible at other places in Eastern U.P.

The Tal being visited by a large variety and Species of migratory Birds it is also a local Tourist attraction in the area.

References

Lakes of Uttar Pradesh
Bird sanctuaries of Uttar Pradesh
Ballia district